Katie Edwards (born 14 August 1978) is an English academic, author, columnist, and broadcaster.

Early life 
Edwards was born and raised in Mexborough, Doncaster, England and attended a comprehensive school in Rotherham.

Education 
Edwards was awarded a first class degree and a PhD in Biblical Studies from the University of Sheffield, where she worked as an academic in the School of English from 2012 to 2020. She is currently a visiting fellow in the Department of Theology and Religious Studies at the University of Chester.

Career

Academic Research 

Religion and sexual violence is a key area of Edwards's academic research. Until 2020, she was a founding co-director of The Shiloh Project, an academic collaboration dedicated to the study of religion and rape culture. In 2018, an article Edwards co-authored about Jesus and sexual violence sparked widespread discussion in the media.

Broadcasting 

Edwards is a radio presenter   and appears regularly on local and national radio as a current affairs commentator.

Edwards wrote and presented the 2018 Lent Talk 'Silence of the Lamb' for BBC Radio 4, which won The Jersualem Award in the Festivals (Radio) category in 2018 and was awarded Runner Up in the Audio/Radio category at the Sandford St Martin Awards in 2019.

Edwards has written several articles about the trolling of Katie Price in the national press. In December 2022, Edwards featured in a Channel 5 documentary, Shameless: The Rise and Fall of Katie Price, charting Price's career trajectory.

Journalism 

Edwards has written widely for the Press, including The Guardian, The i Newspaper, The Daily Telegraph, The Washington Post, the New Statesman, The Independent, and Newsweek.

Edwards wrote extensively on the Depp v. Heard trial in 2022 and was interviewed by news channels, including BBC Worldwide, TalkTV and numerous radio programmes, commenting on the ruling.

Work On Accent Prejudice 

Edwards has publicly discussed her experience of accent prejudice in higher education and her articles have been cited in the media, in English language subject educational materials, and academic work on accentism.

References

External links 
 Official website
 Twitter account
 Author profile at The Independent
 Author profile at The i Paper
 Author profile at RCW Literary Agency

1978 births
Living people
People from Mexborough
People from South Yorkshire
Alumni of the University of Sheffield
People from Doncaster
British media critics
English columnists
English feminists
English humanists
English non-fiction writers
English social commentators
British opinion journalists
The Guardian journalists
The Independent people